Marie-Véronique Antoinette Colette Jeannine Marot (born 16 September 1955) is a former marathon runner from France who moved to England in 1976. She twice broke the British record for the marathon, with 2:28:04 at the 1985 Chicago Marathon and 2:25:56 when winning the 1989 London Marathon. The latter time stood as the UK record for 13 years. She is also a three-time winner of the Houston Marathon and represented Great Britain at the 1992 Barcelona Olympics.

Career
Marot was born in Compiègne, France. She moved to England in 1976 to study at York University and became a British citizen in 1983. Early in her running career, Marot competed in several fell races. In 1979 she unofficially completed the Ennerdale Fell Race before women were allowed to take part, to the consternation of the race organiser. The next year, women were allowed to compete over the full course.

Marot first ran under three hours for the marathon, running 2:55:38 at the 1980 Barnsley Marathon. At the inaugural London Marathon in 1981, she finished ninth, improving her best to 2:46:51. She further improved with 2:42:14 for 21st at the 1983 London Marathon and 2:36:24 for 7th at the 1983 New York Marathon. She improved again with 2:33:52 for fourth at the 1984 London Marathon, before finishing second at the 1984 New York Marathon with 2:33:58. She broke the British record for the first time when finishing fifth at the 1985 Chicago Marathon, running 2:28:04. A three-time winner of the Houston Marathon, she first won it in 1986, running 2:31:33. Later that year, she failed to finish at the 1986 European Championships in Stuttgart. At the 1987 World Championships in Rome, she finished 22nd in 2:45:02. She earned selection for the 1988 Olympic Games but declined it due to injury.

1989 began with Marot winning the Houston Marathon for the second time, with 2:30:16. Then in April, she won the 1989 London Marathon in 2.25.56, regaining the British record from Priscilla Welch, who had run 2:26:51 in 1987. Marot's time stood as the British record for 13 years until it was broken by Paula Radcliffe in 2002. Marot won the Houston Marathon for the third time in 1991, running 2:30:55, before failing to finish at the 1991 World Championships in Tokyo. In 1992, she finished 16th at the Barcelona Olympics in 2:42:55. She also twice won the Around the Bay Road Race in Ontario (1991 and 1992). In 2003, aged 47, she finished 24th at the London Marathon, running 2:55:01. Marot (as of 2022) ranks fifth on the UK all-time list behind Radcliffe, Jess Piasecki, Mara Yamauchi and Charlotte Purdue.

Personal life

Marot has a son and a daughter with her coach, Brian Scobie.

Achievements

Note: In 1985 Marot ran the London Marathon just 8 days after running in the World Cup Marathon.

References

External links 
 Power of 10 UK Women’s Marathon Rankings
  Independent article by Simon Turnbull
  IAAF biography
  British record progression
 Leeds City Athletics Club
 gbrathletics

1955 births
Living people
People from Compiègne
Sportspeople from Oise
French emigrants to England
British female long-distance runners
British female marathon runners
London Marathon female winners
Athletes (track and field) at the 1992 Summer Olympics
Olympic athletes of Great Britain
World Athletics Championships athletes for Great Britain
British fell runners
Naturalised citizens of the United Kingdom